The Letter is the sixth studio album by English singer Lemar. It was released by BMG on 9 October 2015, and contains the singles "The Letter" and "Love Turned Hate". The album reached number 31 on the UK Albums Chart, an improvement on his two previous albums which fell short of the Top 40.

Critical reception

Michael Cragg from The Observer called the album "a classy, patchy soul makeover" and rated the album three stars out of five. L. Michael Gipson from SoulTracks felt that album "sees a return to the covers that made him an instant hit with fans [...] As for whether or not The Letter represents a creative peak or valley, let’s just say it represents more of the same safe choices we’ve seen from Lemar over the last nine or so years, one of more promise than fulfillment."

Track listing
All tracks produced by Larry Klein.

Charts

Release history

References

2015 albums
Lemar albums
Albums recorded at EastWest Studios

pl:The Letter